Perovo is a Moscow Metro station on Kalininsko-Solntsevskaya Line. It was opened on 30 December 1979 along with the Kalininsky radius at a depth of nine metres.

Name
Named after Perovo District in the Eastern Administrative Okrug.

Building
The architects Nina Aleshina and Volovich adopted a single-vault design with hinged aluminium lighting elements. The decorative design of the station is devoted to the Russian folk arts. The  walls are decorated with blocks with screw-threaded rocks, and original patterns above the entrance portals (by L. Novikova and B. Filatov). The walls are revetted with white marble above and black gabbro below. The floor, which has several high marble stalls surrounded by benches, is faced with grey, black and brown granite.

The station has two exits, both interlinked with the underground subways under the Zelyony Avenue and 2nd Vladimirskaya street. Presently the station has a relatively low passenger traffic of 49300 passengers.

External links

Moscow Metro stations
Railway stations in Russia opened in 1979
Kalininsko-Solntsevskaya line
Railway stations located underground in Russia